Scott Durbin Hardesty  (January 26, 1870 - October 29, 1944) was an infielder in Major League Baseball.

External links

1870 births
1944 deaths
Major League Baseball shortstops
New York Giants (NL) players
19th-century baseball players
Baseball players from Ohio
Kenton Babes players
Mansfield Kids players
Lima Kids players
Jackson Wolverines players
Washington Little Senators players
Paterson Silk Weavers players
Newark Colts players
Norfolk Jewels players
Paterson Weavers players
Dayton Veterans players
Columbus Senators players
Fort Wayne Railroaders players
Kansas City Blues (baseball) players
Hartford Senators players
Little Rock Travelers players
New London Whalers players
Springfield Ponies players
People from Bellville, Ohio